Slovakia has submitted films for the Academy Award for Best International Feature Film since 1993. The award is handed out annually by the United States Academy of Motion Picture Arts and Sciences to a feature-length motion picture produced outside the United States that contains primarily non-English dialogue.

The Slovak submission is decided annually by the Slovak Film and Television Academy (Slovenská filmová a televízna akadémia). , twenty-four Slovak films have been submitted for consideration, none of which have been nominated for an Oscar. Seven of these have been directed by Martin Šulík.

Until 1993, the Slovak Republic was a constituent republic within Czechoslovakia, and Czech and Slovaks routinely collaborated on national productions. The Shop on Main Street, which won the Best Foreign Film Oscar in 1966 for Czechoslovakia, was a Slovak-language production. It was also the first Czechoslovak film ever to be nominated for an Oscar. The Assistant (1982) and The Millennial Bee (1983) were also Slovak films submitted by Czechoslovakia for the Oscars.

Submissions
The Academy of Motion Picture Arts and Sciences has invited the film industries of various countries to submit their best film for the Academy Award for Best Foreign Language Film since 1956. The Foreign Language Film Award Committee oversees the process and reviews all the submitted films. Following this, they vote via secret ballot to determine the five nominees for the award. Below is a list of the films that have been submitted by the Slovak Republic for review by the Academy for the award by the year of the submission and the respective Academy Award ceremony.

Most films were at least partially in Slovak, although All My Loved Ones was primarily in Czech and Return of the Storks and King of Thieves had much of their dialogue in German.

In 2008 the producers of Bathory protested the decision of the Slovak Academy not to consider their film, the most expensive in Slovak history, for an Oscar nomination. The Slovak Academy said the multi-national production, which was filmed in Slovak- and English-language versions, did not qualify as a majority-Slovak production, in part because none of the lead cast came from Slovakia. The Academy instead chose documentary Blind Loves from a shortlist of four films.

See also
List of Czechoslovak submissions for the Academy Award for Best Foreign Language Film
List of Academy Award winners and nominees for Best Foreign Language Film
List of Academy Award-winning foreign language films
Cinema of Slovakia

Notes

References

External links
The Official Academy Awards Database
The Motion Picture Credits Database
IMDb Academy Awards Page

Slovakia
Academy Award